The Old Brewery Quarter, also known simply as the Brewery Quarter or the Brewery ¼, is a modern mixed-use development in the centre of Cardiff, Wales, on the site of the original Brains Brewery, with entrances on St. Mary's Street and Caroline Street.

Background
Samuel Arther Brain bought the site in 1882, which was already known as the "Old Brewery", the first brewery on the site dating back to 1713. The site included a pub, The Albert.

Redevelopment

Despite an expansion in the 1980s, the site became too small for the brewery, and in 1999 Brains vacated the Old Brewery to take over the larger Cardiff Brewery. The Old Brewery site was redeveloped, a joint venture between SA Brain & Co and Countryside Properties (though Brains later bought out their partner), with the new area opening in October 2003.

The development has attracted a range of bar and restaurant operators including Starbucks, Nandos, Thai Edge, Pancake House, La Tasca, and Chiquito.

References

External links 
 
 

Buildings and structures in Cardiff
Redevelopment projects in Cardiff
2003 establishments in Wales